Jinshan Avenue Station, is the planned terminus of Line 1 of Wuhan Metro. It is located in Dongxihu District.

References

Wuhan Metro stations
Line 1, Wuhan Metro